The Pohnpei cicadabird (Edolisoma insperatum) is a species of bird in the family Campephagidae. It is endemic to the Caroline Islands. It was previously considered conspecific with the common cicadabird.

Its natural habitat is subtropical or tropical moist lowland forest.

References

Pohnpei cicadabird
Pohnpei cicadabird